Bucculatrix pallidula is a species of moth in the family Bucculatricidae. It is found in North America, where it has been recorded from Maine and Utah. It was described in 1963 by Annette Frances Braun.

The wingspan is about 5.5 mm. The forewings are creamy white, dusted with pale ocherous scales, some of which are 
minutely brown-tipped. The hindwings are whitish ocherous. Adults have been recorded on wing in from June to July.

The larvae feed on a labiate shrub. They mine the leaves of their host plant. The mine has the form of a translucent blotch between two main veins at the base of the leaf. Pupation takes place outside of the mine in a brownish ocherous cocoon.

References

Natural History Museum Lepidoptera generic names catalog

Bucculatricidae
Moths described in 1963
Moths of North America
Taxa named by Annette Frances Braun